J. Thomas Rimer (born 2 March 1933) is an American scholar of Japanese literature and drama. He is a Professor Emeritus of Japanese Literature,
Theatre, and Art at the University of Pittsburgh. He has served as the chief of the Asian Division of the Library of Congress.

Rimer has written about Classical Japanese literature, as well as modern Japanese drama, and has translated several works. He has written several works for a popular audience, and has been credited with making Japanese drama more accessible to Americans.

Rimer earned a PhD in Japanese Literature from Columbia University in 1971.

References

Living people
American translators
Columbia University alumni
University of Pittsburgh faculty
American Japanologists
1933 births
Japanese literature academics